The GP Liberazione is an elite women's road bicycle race held in the Italy. It is rated by the UCI as a 1.2 category race.

Past winners

References 

Cycle races in Italy
Women's road bicycle races
Defunct cycling races in Italy
1989 establishments in Italy
Recurring sporting events established in 1989
2012 disestablishments in Italy
Recurring sporting events disestablished in 2012
Sport in Lombardy